Captain Bill is a 1936 British comedy film directed by Ralph Ceder and starring Leslie Fuller, Judy Kelly and Hal Gordon. A barge operator helps a schoolteacher tackle a gang of criminals.

Cast
 Leslie Fuller - Bill
 Judy Kelly - Polly
 Hal Gordon - Tim
 O. B. Clarence - Sir Anthony Kipps
 Toni Edgar-Bruce - Lady Kipps
 Georgie Harris - Georgie
 D.J. Williams - Cheerful
 Ralph Truman - Red

References

Bibliography
 Sutton, David R. A chorus of raspberries: British film comedy 1929-1939. University of Exeter Press, 2000.

External links
 

1936 films
1936 comedy films
British comedy films
Films directed by Ralph Ceder
British black-and-white films
Films shot at Rock Studios
1930s English-language films
1930s British films